Traylor Elizabeth Howard is an American actress. Her roles include Sharon Carter on the television series Two Guys and a Girl, and Natalie Teeger on the USA Network series Monk.

Early life
 
Howard was born in Orlando, Florida, to Peggy E. (née Traylor) and Robert M. Howard, Jr., president of the Howard Fertilizer and Chemical Company. She attended Lake Highland Preparatory School in Orlando, Florida. She went on to graduate from Florida State University with a degree in communications and advertising and a minor in English.

Career
Howard started her career in 1994 when she appeared in one of the "You Will" series of  television commercials for AT&T Corporation. 

Howard's acting roles were as Natalie Teeger, assistant to Tony Shalhoub's Adrian Monk on the USA Network television series Monk from 2005 to 2009, and as Sharon Carter, the "girl" of the title of the ABC sitcom Two Guys and a Girl (titled Two Guys, a Girl, and a Pizza Place for the first two seasons), from 1998 to 2001.

She also starred in the short-lived sitcoms Boston Common and Bram & Alice alongside actor Alfred Molina. In 1999 she appeared in the Foo Fighters' music video "Breakout". During the third season of The West Wing, Howard made a guest appearance. She was the romantic lead in the Norm Macdonald film Dirty Work.

Personal life
In 2011, Howard married Jarel Portman (son of John C. Portman Jr.). They have a son, Julien.

In July 2019, Howard was interviewed by Jane Mayer for a New Yorker piece detailing sexual misconduct allegations against former United States Senator Al Franken, with whom she performed on a USO tour in 2005. She defended Franken against misconduct allegations, saying, in part, "I get the whole #MeToo thing, and a whole lot of horrible stuff has happened, and it needed to change. But that's not what was happening here. Franken is a good man."

Filmography

Film

Television

References

External links

Year of birth missing (living people)
20th-century American actresses
21st-century American actresses
Actresses from Orlando, Florida
American film actresses
American television actresses
Florida State University alumni
Living people
Lake Highland Preparatory School alumni